Al Sabith (born 8 May 2006
) is an Indian child actor and TV host associated with the Malayalam film and television industry. He is best known for playing child character  the Flowers sitcom Uppum Mulakum.

Career

Al Sabith appeared in front of the camera for the first time as an infant at the age of 2, for a Hindu devotional album where he enacted the role of Lord Ayyappan. After being part of few reality and chat shows, he was offered to do the role of Keshu in Uppum Mulakum serial telecasting in Flowers TV.

Al Sabith appeared in various TV awards shows as performer and television commercials for the brands like Asianet broadband, Gold FM, RK Wedding centre, Flowers 94.7 FM, Maple tune, flowers TV and many others.

After the success of Uppum Mulakum, he got numerous offers from film industry. In 2018, he acted in Sathyan Anthikkad’s film Njan Prakashan along with Fahadh Faasil and Sreenivasan.

He has also acted in Jayaram and Vijay Septhupathi starrer Markoni Mathai.

Filmography

Films

Television

Awards
Mangalam TV Awards
2017 : Best child artist
Janmabhoomi Awards
2019 : Best child artist

References

External links 
 

21st-century Indian male child actors
Living people
Male actors in Malayalam television
Indian male child actors
Indian male film actors
Male actors in Malayalam cinema
2006 births